Mashonda Karima Dean (born January 9, 1978) is an American R&B singer from Boston, Massachusetts. She appeared on several songs from hip hop artists in the 2000s. In 2004, she married record producer Swizz Beatz, and was once signed to his label Full Surface, under the aegis of J Records. Mashonda released her debut studio album January Joy in 2005. In 2011, Mashonda was a member of the first season of VH1's reality show Love & Hip Hop: New York.

Musical career
In 1998, Mashonda signed a publishing deal with Warner Chapel Music. She subsequently wrote for singer Monifah and worked with Full Force. The following year, she signed a recording contract with Columbia Records.

In 1999, she was featured on American rapper Jay-Z's single "Girl's Best Friend", for the soundtrack to the film Blue Streak. The song, produced by Swizz Beatz, was also included as a hidden track on Jay-Z's fourth studio album Vol. 3... Life and Times of S. Carter (1999). Mashonda's vocals also featured on American rapper Eve's song "Gotta Man", produced by Beatz, from her debut studio album Let There Be Eve...Ruff Ryders' First Lady (1999). Mashonda went on to make guest appearances on American rapper Cassidy's "Get No Better", produced by Beatz, from his album Split Personality (2004), and American rapper Fat Joe's Beatz-produced song "Listen Baby", from his 2005 album All or Nothing.

Mashonda's debut album January Joy, produced by Beatz, Kanye West, and Raphael Saadiq, was released in November 2005 in Japan. The album was supported by two singles, co-written by Beatz: "Back of da Club", featuring Beatz, and "Blackout" featuring Snoop Dogg. In March 2009, she released a mixtape titled The Renovation Series.. Mashonda took time off from her music career to raise her son.

Other ventures
Mashonda was the author of a column, "Pandora's Box", on Vibe Vixen.

Mashonda authored a book on co-parenting, titled Blend: The Secret to Co-Parenting and Creating a Balanced Family (2018), with contributions from co-parents Swizz Beatz and Alicia Keys.

Personal life
Mashonda began dating record producer Kasseem Dean, known as Swizz Beatz, in 1998. She had a miscarriage in 2000. She was step mom to Beatz's son Nasir, who was born during her pregnancy and whom she named. She and Beatz married in 2004.  Their son, Kasseem Dean, Jr., was born in 2006. In 2008 the couple announced their break up. According to Swizz, they had been separated nine or 10 months by June 2008, after he began his affair with singer Alicia Keys. The divorce was finalized in May 2010, citing irreconcilable differences.

Discography

Studio albums
January Joy (2005)
Note To Self (2022)

Mixtapes
The Renovation Series (2009)
Love, Mashonda (2012)

Singles
As lead artist
2005: Back Of Da Club
2006: Black Out (feat. Snoop Dogg)
2006: Used To (Promo Only)
2009: Dirty Laundry (feat. Eve)
2009: No Panties (Buzz Single)
2011: Intrigued (Buzz Single)
2011: Juicy Fruit
2012: Touch Me
2012: Mystery (feat. Lil Mo)
2020: King
2021: Honey, I See You
2022: Forbidden Fruit
2022: Positive Distraction
2022: Complicated

Guest appearances

Filmography

References 

Living people
1978 births
21st-century American singers
20th-century American singers
20th-century African-American women singers
Participants in American reality television series
20th-century American women singers
21st-century American women singers
21st-century African-American women singers
African-American women writers